Below are the squads for the 2012 Bandy World Championship final tournament in Kazakhstan.

Group A

Finland

Kazakhstan

Norway

Russia

Sweden
Coach: Franco Bergman

United States

References

Bandy World Championship squads